Cystangium is a genus of fungi in the family Russulaceae. The genus contains 32 species that are distributed in Australia and South America. Cystangium was described by American mycologists Rolf Singer and Alexander H. Smith in 1960.

The taxon is phylogenetically part of Russula and thus probably a synonym. However, it has not been formally synonymised yet and continues to be used by taxonomists.

Species

Cystangium balpineum
Cystangium bisporum
Cystangium capitis-orae
Cystangium clavatum
Cystangium depauperatum
Cystangium domingueziae
Cystangium echinosporum
Cystangium flavovirens
Cystangium gamundiae
Cystangium grandihyphatum
Cystangium idahoensis
Cystangium longisterigmatum
Cystangium luteobrunneum
Cystangium lymanensis
Cystangium macrocystidium
Cystangium maculatum
Cystangium medlockii
Cystangium megasporum
Cystangium nothofagi
Cystangium oregonense
Cystangium phymatodisporum
Cystangium pineti
Cystangium pisiglarea
Cystangium polychromum
Cystangium rodwayi
Cystangium seminudum
Cystangium sessile
Cystangium shultziae
Cystangium sparsum
Cystangium thaxteri
Cystangium theodoroui
Cystangium trappei
Cystangium variabilisporum
Cystangium vesiculosum
Cystangium xanthocarpum

References

Russulales
Russulales genera
Taxa named by Rolf Singer